Loi Wengwo is a mountain of the Shan Hills, in Shan State, Burma.

Geography
Loi Wengwo is located about 6 km to the west of Mong Ping in Mong Ping Township of Mongsat District, overlooking the valley.

See also
List of mountains in Burma

References

External links
Google Books, The Physical Geography of Southeast Asia

Geography of Shan State
Mountains of Myanmar
Shan Hills